Vangjel Zguro (born 4 March 1993) is an Albanian professional footballer who plays as a left-back for KF Skënderbeu Korçë.

Club career

Korabi Peshkopi
In July 2016, Zguro joined newly promoted Albanian Superliga side Korabi Peshkopi by signing a one-year contract. He made his team debut as well as Albanian Superliga debut on 2 October in the 3–2 away win over Teuta Durrës.

On 27 December, following the end of the first part of the season, Zguro was released from his contract, ending his cooperation with the club, becoming a free agent in the process.

Luftëtari Gjirokastër
Within a day after his release, Zguro joined fellow Albanian Superliga side Luftëtari Gjirokastër on a free transfer. He was presented to the media on the same day where he apologized for the incidents back when he was part of Pogradeci.

Kamza
On 9 January 2018, Zguro agreed to personal terms and joined Kamza. After penning the contract, he then flew out to Antalya, Turkey to link up with the rest of the squad on their winter training camp. He was presented four days later where he was given squad number 31 for the second part of 2017–18 season. Zguro made his first Kamza appearance on 26 January in the home match versus Laçi, receiving a yellow card in 49th minute as the team won 3–1.

He scored his maiden goal for the club, also his first in two years, on 14 April in the 3–2 loss to Skënderbeu Korçë, netting the temporarily equalizer with a free kick. Zguro played 16 times in the second part of 2017–18 season, as Kazma narrowly escaped relegation by winning in the final match versus Partizani Tirana.

Kukësi
On 17 June 2018, Kukësi announced to have signed Zguro on a one-year contract, with the defender taking squad number 8.

Chattanooga Red Wolves
On 2 January 2019, Zguro joined USL League One side Chattanooga Red Wolves ahead of their inaugural 2019 season.

FC Tulsa
On 23 December 2019, Zguro moved up to the USL Championship, joining FC Tulsa ahead of their 2020 season.

Skënderbeu
In January 2022, Zguro returned to Albania and signed for KF Skënderbeu Korçë.

Career statistics

References

External links
 
 FSHF profile
 

1993 births
Living people
Albanian footballers
Albanian expatriate footballers
People from Pogradec
People from Korçë County
Association football midfielders
KS Pogradeci players
KF Butrinti players
KF Korabi Peshkopi players
Luftëtari Gjirokastër players
FC Kamza players
FK Kukësi players
Chattanooga Red Wolves SC players
FC Tulsa players
KF Skënderbeu Korçë players
Kategoria Superiore players
Kategoria e Parë players
USL League One players
Albanian expatriate sportspeople in the United States
Expatriate soccer players in the United States